Dr Khin Maung Win (also known as Khin Maung Win (Math), 23 October 1940 – 3 August 2021) was a Burmese writer and retired math professor at the Yangon University. He is notable for topics ranging from math teachings and literature and has written many mathematical books in his career. His math books were collected for all school libraries as part of a development project of Myanmar Education.

Early life and education 
Khin Maung Win was born on 23 October 1940, in Rangoon, Burma. He was the only son of prominent author Khin Myo Chit and her husband Khin Maung Lat, an author. He graduated with math General Honors BA (Gen. Hons.) in 1956 and MA (Math) in 1966 from Yangon University, and received PhD from the University of Caen Normandy in 1970.

Personal life 
Khin married Tatkatho Shwe Yi Win, an author, in 1967. They have twin children, Maung Yeet and Junior Win, who is also an author.

Literary career 
He is also an author and wrote under the pen name of Khin Maung Win (Math). He has written many books, articles, and mathematical sciences on different topics ranging from math teachings and literature.

Two times a week, he wrote English articles at Working People Daily newspaper from 1987 to 1988. Later in 1990, he wrote articles about his thoughts. Later, he has written articles at the new style, Paduck Pwint Thit and Cherry Magazines.

Publications 
 သင်္ချာသစ် (စာပေဗိမာန်) 1986–1987
 အခြေခံသင်္ချာသစ် (လောကသစ်စာပေ) 1991
 ဂိမ်းသီအိုရီ (ဒေါင်းစာပေ) 2001
 သင်္ချာပညာတော်သင်ဘဝ (ဒေါင်းစာပေ) 2003
 ခေတ်သစ်သင်္ချာ (စိတ်ကူးချိုချို) 2003
 သင်္ချာဝေါဟာရ (မုံရွေးစာပေ) 2003
 အသက်ကိုဖန်တီးခြင်း (ဒေါင်းစာပေ) (တက္ကသိုလ်ရွှေရီဝင်းနှင့်တွဲ၍) 2003
 သင်္ချာအတွေးအခေါ်ဆောင်းပါးများ (ယူနတီ) (တက္ကသိုလ်ရွှေရီဝင်းနှင့်တွဲ၍) 2004
 ဖက်ဇီလောဂျစ် (မုံရွေး) 2004
 ကွန်ပြူတာသုံးသင်္ချာ (မြန်မာ society) 2004
 နဝမတန်းသင်္ချာအကြောင်းသိကောင်းစရာ (ယူနတီ) 2005
 သင်္ချာအဘိဓာန် (ဓူဝံစာပေ) (ဂျူနီယာဝင်း နှင့်တွဲ၍) 2005
 သင်္ချာမိတ်ဆက် (မုံရွှေး) 2005
 သင်္ချာဝေါဟာရ – ၂ (မုံရွေး) 2005
 ဒေးကားမိတ်ဆက် (မုံရွေး) ၂၀၀၆
 ပထမနှစ်သိပ္ပံ (အဝေးသင်) (စိတ်ကူးချိုချို) 2006
 ၁ဝ တန်း သင်္ချာပုစ္ဆာများကို သရုပ်ခွဲလေ့လာနည်း (စိတ်ကူးချိုချို) 2006
 စကြာဝဠာ မိတ်ဆက် (မုံရွေး) (တက္ကသိုလ်ရွှေရီဝင်းနှင့်တွဲ၍) 2006
 ကမ္ဘာနှင့်အိမ်နီးချင်းဂြိုဟ်များ (မုံရွေး) 2007 (တက္ကသိုလ်ရွှေရီဝင်းနှင့်တွဲ၍)
 ရောင်စုံလှစွာပြည်မြန်မာ (ပါရမီ) 2007
 ပညာအလင်းမိတ်ဆက် (မုံရွေး) 2007
 ခေတ်သစ်အတွက်ပညာရေး (မုံရွေး) 2008
 ပညာရှာခြင်းနှင့် မှတ်မိခြင်းမိတ်ဆက် (မုံရွေး) 2008

References 

 Voice of America Tribute to Dr Khin Maung Win, Interview with Sayar Kyawe. Original Air Date : 25 July 2008.
 Burmese Encyclopedia Vol 4, p-742 Printed 1980.

1940 births
2021 deaths
Burmese writers
People from Yangon Region
Deaths from the COVID-19 pandemic in Myanmar